Georgi Bozhanov (born 7 October 1988 in Velingrad) is a Bulgarian former footballer who played as a midfielder.

Honours

Club
 Beroe
Bulgarian Cup:
Winner: 2009-10

References

External links

1988 births
Living people
Bulgarian footballers
Association football midfielders
First Professional Football League (Bulgaria) players
PFC Beroe Stara Zagora players
PFC Minyor Pernik players